Massimo "Miki" Biasion (born 7 January 1958) is an Italian rally driver, two-time World Rally champion.

Career

Biasion was born in Bassano del Grappa, Veneto.

Biasion came to prominence in the early 1980s, winning both the Italian and European Rally Championships in 1983, driving a Lancia 037. He began competing in 1979, in an Opel Kadett GT/E. He was later drafted in to play a key role for the works Lancia World Rally Championship team in the mid-1980s as the squad sought to regroup after previous star driver Henri Toivonen's fatal crash, and would go on to dominate early Group A rallying, taking the world championship in the years 1988 and 1989. At his peak, Biasion was notching victories in almost three quarters of all events he entered. He also was only the second driver to successfully defend his title (after Juha Kankkunen) and the third one to win two titles (after Kankkunen and Walter Röhrl).

After his championship years, Biasion was never able to achieve that level of success again.  He failed to win an event for Lancia in 1991, and switched to Ford for 1992 on a contract that made him the highest-paid driver of his day, and gave him some managerial input.  The optimism did not last.  Biasion reputedly described the Ford Sierra RS Cosworth 4x4 as "a pile of shit" after his first event for the team (the 1992 Monte Carlo Rally), although on the Portuguese Rally he did give the car its best WRC result by finishing second. The following year, driving the new Ford Escort RS Cosworth, he won the Acropolis Rally and led the driver's championship for part of the season.

Throughout Biasion's tenure at Ford he was overshadowed by the younger François Delecour, who generally proved to be faster, especially on tarmac. Moreover, Delecour's road accident, which forced him to sit out much of the 1994 season, exposed the weaknesses in the team. Insufficient resources meant that development of the Escort slipped behind its rivals, and Biasion's relationship with the team worsened as the season progressed. He was subsequently dropped for the following year. After contesting a couple of rallies for private teams, he retired quietly at the end of the 1995 season (his two last WRC events were part of the 2LWC prior to the late Colin McRae's honor as 1995 World Rally Champion, but this truly last WRC event was the RAC (now Wales Rally GB) in 1994 when it was won by McRae himself and Didier Auriol's honor as 1994 World Rally Champion).

Throughout his entire career he was co-driven by Tiziano Siviero, the sole exception being the Portuguese Rally of 1988, where Siviero was replaced by Carlo Cassina due to health problems.

Biasion won the World Truck Championship in 1998 and 1999 driving an Iveco.

Personal life
Biasion was married to Italian rally driver Chantal Galli, who won the Italian women's rally championship several times. They had four children, named Bettina, Isotta, Jacobo, and Olivia. The pair are now divorced, and Biasion is currently married to Paola.

WRC victories

Complete WRC results

 The results of the 1986 Rallye Sanremo were annulled by the FIA.

References

External links

Biasion at RallyBase
Biasion at World Rally Archive

1958 births
Living people
Lancia people
People from Bassano del Grappa
World Rally Champions
World Rally Championship drivers
Italian rally drivers
Dakar Rally drivers
European Rally Championship drivers
Rally raid truck drivers
Sportspeople from the Province of Vicenza